This list includes high-ranking commanders in Order of battle of the Indonesian National Armed Forces as of January 1946 who took part in Indonesian National Revolution:

 
20th-century revolutions
Separatism in Indonesia
Dutch East Indies
Wars of independence
20th-century conflicts
Separatism in the Netherlands
Wars involving the Netherlands
Wars involving Indonesia
Wars involving the United Kingdom
Wars involving Japan
1945 in Indonesia
1946 in Indonesia
1947 in Indonesia
1948 in Indonesia
1949 in Indonesia
Aftermath of World War II in Indonesia
Wars involving British India
Wars involving Australia
Indonesia–Netherlands relations
Proxy wars